Mulberry Hill is a historic house located at Lexington, Virginia. It was built in at least four different building periods that range from the late-18th century to the early 20th century.  The original section was built about 1798.  It two-story, five bay, brick dwelling with a four-room, double-pile, central-passage plan.  Its hipped roof was added about 1903.  The interior features unusually elaborate though provincial Georgian woodwork and plasterwork in the principal rooms.

It was listed on the National Register of Historic Places in 1982. It has been the headquarters of Kappa Alpha Order, a college fraternity that was founded next door at Washington and Lee University, since 2004.

References

Houses on the National Register of Historic Places in Virginia
Houses completed in 1798
Federal architecture in Virginia
Georgian architecture in Virginia
Houses in Lexington, Virginia
National Register of Historic Places in Lexington, Virginia
Kappa Alpha Order